Lyons is a rural locality in the City of Logan, Queensland, Australia. In the  Lyons had a population of 32 people.

Geography
The locality  is partly used for farming but is mostly undeveloped.

History
The name Lyons comes from the settler William Lyons who lived in the area in the 1880s.

Formerly in the Shire of Beaudesert, Lyons became part of Logan City following the local government amalgamations in March 2008.

In the  Lyons had a population of 32 people.

References

Suburbs of Logan City
Localities in Queensland